Ononis mitissima is a species of annual herb in the family Fabaceae. They have a self-supporting growth form and broad leaves. Individuals can grow to 5 cm tall.

Sources

References 

mitissima
Flora of Malta